Yomara Hinestroza Murillo (born 20 May 1988) is a track and field sprint athlete who competes internationally for Colombia.

Biography
Hinestroza represented Colombia at the 2008 Summer Olympics in Beijing. She competed at the 100 metres sprint and placed fourth in her first round heat, which normally meant elimination. However, her time of 11.39 was among the ten fastest losing times, resulting in a second round spot. There she failed to qualify for the semi finals as her time of 11.66 was the seventh time of her race.

At the 2012 Olympics, she represented Colombia in the 100 m and was part of the Colombian 4 x 100 m team.

She also represented Colombia at the 2009 and 2011 World Championships.

Personal bests
100 m: 11.54 s (wind: +0.4 m/s) –  Bogotá, 19 July 2008
200 m: 23.09 s (wind: +0.1 m/s) –  Bogotá, 3 December 2004

Achievements

References

External links
 
 
 

1988 births
Living people
Sportspeople from Valle del Cauca Department
Colombian female sprinters
Olympic athletes of Colombia
Athletes (track and field) at the 2008 Summer Olympics
Athletes (track and field) at the 2012 Summer Olympics
Athletes (track and field) at the 2011 Pan American Games
World Athletics Championships athletes for Colombia
Pan American Games medalists in athletics (track and field)
Pan American Games bronze medalists for Colombia
South American Games gold medalists for Colombia
South American Games silver medalists for Colombia
South American Games medalists in athletics
Competitors at the 2006 South American Games
Competitors at the 2010 South American Games
Central American and Caribbean Games gold medalists for Colombia
Central American and Caribbean Games silver medalists for Colombia
Central American and Caribbean Games bronze medalists for Colombia
Competitors at the 2006 Central American and Caribbean Games
Competitors at the 2010 Central American and Caribbean Games
Central American and Caribbean Games medalists in athletics
Medalists at the 2011 Pan American Games
Olympic female sprinters
21st-century Colombian women